Miroslav Košuta (born 11 March 1936) is a Slovene poet, playwright and translator from Križ by Trieste, a younger representative of Intimism and Socialist Realism. On 7 February 2011, he received the Prešeren Award, the highest cultural award in Slovenia, for his poetry and contributions to the preservation of the Slovene in Italy.

References

1936 births
Living people
Slovenian poets
Slovenian male poets
Slovenian dramatists and playwrights
Italian–Slovene translators
Spanish–Slovene translators
Writers from Trieste
Italian Slovenes
Prešeren Award laureates
Levstik Award laureates